Japanese particles,  or , are suffixes or short words in Japanese grammar that immediately follow the modified noun, verb, adjective, or sentence. Their grammatical range can indicate various meanings and functions, such as speaker affect and assertiveness.

Orthography and diction
These exceptions are a relic of historical kana usage.

Types of particles 
There are eight types of particles, depending on what function they serve.

ga, no, o, ni, e, to, de, kara, yori

ka, no, ya, ni, to, yara, nari, dano

ka, no, ya, na, wa, tomo, kashira

sa, yo, ne

bakari, made, dake, hodo, kurai, nado, nari, yara

wa, mo, koso, demo, shika, sae, dani

ba, ya, ga, te, noni, node, kara, tokoroga, keredomo, kuseni

no, kara

Note that some particles appear in two types. For example, kara is called a "case marker" where it describes where something is from or what happens after something; when it describes a cause it is called a "conjunctive particle".

List of particles

Index

 bakari
 bakari ka
 bakashi
 dake
 da no
 de
 de mo
 dokoro ka
 e
 ga
 hodo
 ka
 kai
 ka na
 kara
 ka shira
 kedo
 kiri
 kke
 koro/goro
 koso
 kurai/gurai
 made
 made ni
 me
 mo
 mono/mon
 mono de
 mono ka/mon-ka
 mono nara
 mono o
 na and naa
 nado
 nanka/nante
 nara
 ne
 ni
 ni te
 ni wa
 no
 no de
 nomi
 no ni
 o
 sa/saa
 sae
 de sae
 sae...ba/ra
 shi
 shika
 sura
 to
 to ka
 to mo
 tte
 tteba
 wa
 ya
 yara
 yo
 yori
 ze
 zo
 zutsu

Meaning and usage

{{Japanese particle
| element = With verbs
| example = Nomimono
| rei     = 飲み物
| translation = Drink
| example2= Tabemono| rei2    = 食べ物
| translation2= Food
| example3= Ikimono
| rei3    = 生き物
| translation3= Living thing
}}

Contrast

は wa and が ga

に ni and で deNi and de can both be used to show location, corresponding to the prepositions "in" or "at" in English.  Their uses are mutually exclusive.Ni, when used to show location, is used only with stative verbs such as iru, "to be, exist;" aru, "to be, exist, have;" and sumu, "to live, inhabit."

 (Nihon-ni sunde iru. "I live in Japan.")
 (Gakkō-ni iru. "I am in school.")De is used with action verbs to convey the place of action, as opposed to location of being.

 (Gakkō-de neru. "I sleep in/at school.")
*Gakkō-ni neru. *"I sleep to school," is not usually used.

 に ni and へ e Ni and e can both indicate direction of motion, literally meaning "to" or "at" in English. However, as particles in Japanese directly modify the preceding noun, some Japanese language courses call this the "goal of movement" usage because it marks the goal of the movement. For example, in the sentence  (Watashi wa uchi ni kaerimasu or "I'm going back home") the goal of the movement is home (uchi ni). In this sense, e is perhaps closer to English "towards" in terms of use (see example below).  As long as ni is used directionally, it is possible to substitute e in its place.  Ni used in other senses cannot be replaced by e:

 (Gakkō ni iku. "I'm going to school"), where  gakkō, "school," is the destination of  iku, "go."Gakkō e iku. "I'm going to school," where gakkō, "school," is the destination of iku, "go."
 (Gakkō ni iru. "I'm at school"), where  gakkō, "school," is the location of  iru, "be;" not a destination.Gakkō e iru. *"I'm to school," is not a possible construction since "be" is not a verb of motion.
 (Tomodachi ni au "I'll meet my friends") where  tomodachi, "friends,"  is the indirect object of  au, "meet;" not a destination.Tomodachi e au *"I'll meet to my friends," which is impossible because "meet" is not a verb of motion.
 (Hon o kai ni itta "I went to buy a book"), where  kai ni, "to buy," shows purpose or intent, and is a verbal adverb; not destination.Hon o kai e itta *"I went towards buying a book," is not possible because kai, "buying," cannot be a destination.

Indicating direction, using e instead of ni is preferred when ni is used non-directionally in proximity:

 (Tomodachi ni ai ni Kyōto e itta. "I went to Kyoto to meet my friends.")Ni can not be replaced by e in all uses. It is also required with numerical times (but not relative times). For example, ni must be used in the sentence  (Juu ichi ji ni nemasu "I will go to sleep at 11 o'clock") to mark the numerical time (十一時) but it is not used with the relative time words like tomorrow (明日), yesterday (昨日), today (今日), last week (先週), next month (来月), etc. For example, in the sentence  (watashi wa kinou shigoto ni ikimasen deshita "I did not go to work yesterday") no particle is needed for "yesterday" (昨日), but ni is used to mark the goal of movement (仕事に).

が ga and を o
In some cases, ga and o are interchangeable. For example, with the tai form, meaning "want to", it is possible to say either of the following:
 (Gohan ga tabetai. "I want to eat rice.")
 (Gohan o tabetai. "I want to eat rice.")

Similarly, 好き suki, a na adjective meaning "liked", can take either ga or o:
 (Kimi ga suki da "I like you")
 (Kimi o suki de yokatta "I'm glad I like you") (words from a popular song)

The ni naru form suggests a natural change, whereas to naru suggests change to a final stage.

や ya and と toYa is used for incomplete lists, whereas to is used for complete ones.

 Historical particles 
 i was used in Old Japanese and kanbun works. Its meaning is still debated, but has traditionally been considered emphatic.

Differences from English prepositions
Many Japanese particles fill the role of prepositions in English, but they are unlike prepositions in many ways. Japanese does not have equivalents of prepositions like "on" or "about", and often uses particles along with verbs and nouns to modify another word where English might use prepositions. For example, ue is a noun meaning "top/up"; and ni tsuite is a fixed verbal expression meaning "concerning":

 See also 
 Adposition
 Chinese particles
 Okinawan particles
 Korean particles
 Japanese counter words
 Japanese grammar: particles
 Japanese verb conjugations
 Sentence-final particle
 Particles of the Kagoshima dialects

 Citations 

 General references 
 Chino, Naoko. How to Tell the Difference Between Japanese Particles. Tokyo; New York: Kodansha International, 2005. .
 Makino, Seiichi, and Michio Tsutsui. A Dictionary of Basic Japanese Grammar. Tokyo: Japan Times, 1986. .
 Makino, Seiichi, and Michio Tsutsui. A Dictionary of Intermediate Japanese Grammar. Tokyo: Japan Times, 1997. .
 Martin, Samuel E. A Reference Grammar of Japanese. New Haven, Conn.: Yale University Press, 1975. .
 McClain, Yoko Matsuoka. A Handbook of Modern Japanese Grammar: Including Lists of Words and Expressions with English Equivalents for Reading Aid''. Tokyo: Hokuseido Press, 1981. , .

External links
 

Particles